Francesco Carafa (died 1544) was a Roman Catholic prelate who served as Archbishop of Naples (1530–1544).

Biography
On 24 Jan 1530, Francesco Carafa was appointed during the papacy of Pope Clement VII as Archbishop of Naples.
He served as Archbishop of Naples until his death on 30 Jul 1544.

References 

16th-century Italian Roman Catholic archbishops
Bishops appointed by Pope Clement VII
1544 deaths